Nicholas railway station was the pre-revolutionary name of the termini of the Moscow-Saint Petersburg Railway:

Moscow Passazhirskaya railway station, formerly Nikolayevsky and Leningradsky, in Moscow
Moskovsky railway station (Saint Petersburg) or St.Petersburg-Glavny, in Saint Petersburg